Carleton is a light rail station located along the Trillium Line at Carleton University in Ottawa, Ontario.

Carleton is currently the only O-Train station along the Trillium Line with separate tracks and platforms for each direction, in order to allow the two trains working the otherwise single-track line at any given time to pass. The schedule is timed such that the southbound train arrives first and moves onto the platform siding, and then proceeds once the northbound train has entered the station.

South of Carleton, the train crosses the Rideau River by a bridge. North of Carleton, the train heads into a tunnel under the Rideau Canal.

The station is named for nearby Carleton University.

Facilities

 Accessibility: Wheelchair accessible and underpass to Campus Avenue
 Washroom: None
 Nearby: Carleton University, Rideau River, Brewer Park

Service

The following routes serve Carleton station as of May 3, 2020:

See also 
 Platform gap filler

References

External links

Carleton O-Train station information
Carleton area map with building of Carleton University Complex

Trillium Line stations
Carleton University
Railway stations in Canada at university and college campuses
Railway stations in Canada opened in 2001
2001 establishments in Ontario